HBO Kids (formerly Jam) is an American preschool/children's television morning block operated by Home Box Office, Inc. (HBO), a division of Warner Bros. Discovery. The block runs on HBO Family, HBO's sister station that targets children and families.

The block runs from 6:00 am to roughly 8:00 to 9:00 am (ET) on weekdays; the block's shows are not shown in a standard half-hour timeslot. The block used to have an weekday 4pm timeslot, which was filled with The Electric Company. The block used to also air on weekends until October 2020.

History
In 2001, HBO Family launched two children's programming blocks: Jam in the morning, and Magnet on weekday afternoons. Programming for both blocks was developed in coordination with CINAR Animation, Nelvana Limited, Sony Entertainment, Sandpaper Films, Scholastic, Devine Entertainment, S4C, HiT Entertainment, Golden Egg Entertainment, Poseidon Pictures, Cuppa Coffee Studios, Curious Pictures, Hyperion Pictures, and Planet Grande. Starting in 2007, with a new set of CGI bumpers for the block, HBO began to slowly remove the block's acquired programming, exclusively focusing on HBO's original children's series. For several years, no new programs were produced or acquired for the block, focusing exclusively on reruns of HBO's own children's programs.

On August 13, 2015, HBO announced a deal with Sesame Workshop to move first-run Sesame Street episodes on HBO. The episodes premiered on the network on January 16, 2016, alongside other Sesame Workshop-produced programming, including The Electric Company and Pinky Dinky Doo. The following day (which was January 17), Jam rebranded as HBO Kids. On November 12, 2020, first-run Sesame Street episodes moved to HBO Max (via. Cartoonito) starting with its 51st season.

On August 18, 2018, an animated series entitled Esme & Roy, also produced by Sesame Workshop, premiered. HBO removed all Sesame Workshop shows from its HBO Family channel by January 2021, reverting the block back to HBO's original children's series. However, most of the acquired shows from Sesame Workshop were still available on the HBO Max streaming service until January 2, 2021, with only Sesame Street, Esme & Roy, and any Sesame Workshop show made exclusive for the streaming service still being available. Currently, the block's schedule shows four of HBO's original programs, followed by a children's TV special, before airing one more program, then starting one of the channel's circulated movies or specials.

Programming

Current programming
 1 = Airs occasionally.

Original programming

Former programming 
Harold and the Purple Crayon (December 1, 2001 – 2011)
I Spy (December 2002 – July 2011)
Stuart Little (March 2003 – 2010)

Former acquired programming
Pippi Longstocking (1998–1999) 
Babar (2001 – 2004)
George and Martha (2001 – 2009)
Postman Pat (September 1, 2005 – September 30, 2007)
Magic Cellar
Sesame Street (January 17, 2016 – November 1, 2020, now on PBS Kids and HBO Max)
Fraggle Rock (December 2016 – 2019) (now on Apple TV+)
Animated Tales of the World
Anthony Ant 
Encyclopedia
Esme & Roy
Potatoes and Dragons (2012 – 2020)
Rainbow Fish
The Adventures of Paddington Bear
The Country Mouse and the City Mouse Adventures
The Little Lulu Show
The Neverending Story
The Storyteller (1998–2000)

Reruns of ended Sesame Workshop series

Short-form programming
HBO Family: 411 (1999 – 2016)
Who Knew? (1999 – 2016)
Smart Mouth (1999 – 2016)
Jammin' Animals (2001 – 2016)
My Favorite Book (2001 – 2016)
El Perro y El Gato (2003 – 2016)
Just Wondering (2009 – 2016)
Sesame Street Shorts (January 17, 2016 – November 1, 2020)
And Now You Know
Eat 5
I Want To Be
Matters of Fact
Lisa
The Way I See It (2001 – 2016)
When I'm...

References

Notes

Citations

HBO original programming
Television programming blocks in the United States